Leirbotn is a village in Alta Municipality in Troms og Finnmark county, Norway. Leirbotn Church is located in this village.

References

Villages in Finnmark
Alta, Norway
Populated places of Arctic Norway